Kohler Distinguished Guest Series is a series of lecture and performing arts programs began in 1944 with a current venue at the Kohler Memorial Theatre in Kohler, Wisconsin.

History

The Kohler Women's Club formally established the Distinguished Guest Series in 1944.  The series arranged for guest lectures and art performances on a semi-regular basis during a season than ran from fall to spring the next year.  "Through this series it is the club's purpose to bring to the membership impartial discussion of important events of the day by outstanding authorities. Programs of a purely artistic nature are for cultural uplift".  In the early years, the events were primarily arranged by Ruth DeYoung-Kohler.

The Kohler family had previously on occasion sponsored guest speakers and performers. In 1925, the John Philip Sousa band performed in Kohler for a crowd estimated at 30000. On November 29, 1930, Admiral Richard Byrd appeared before an audience of about 2000 at the Kohler Recreation Hall to talk about his flight over the south pole a year earlier. Admiral Byrd returned in 1947 and appeared as a formal guest during the fourth season of the series.

In the early years, most of the events were limited to members of the Women's Club and were held in the Waelderhaus in Kohler, Wisconsin.  Growing popularity of some of the musical events that were opened to the public necessitated that they be held at the Kohler Recreation Hall.  In 1952, attendance for the Leslie Bell Singers totaled over 1500.

In May 1953, the Kohler Foundation announced that it would join the Kohler Women's Club as a co-sponsor of the series.  This change followed the death of Ruth DeYoung-Kohler in March, 1953.  The events were primarily open to the public and in season 11, all but two of the events were held in the Kohler Recreation Hall. The recreation hall opened in 1927 and was located in the Kohler store building, at the corner of Orchard and Highland St, in Kohler.  Most events were held in the Kohler Memorial center, at the Kohler High School, after it was completed in 1957.

Beginning with the 1970–1971 season, the afternoon lectures and the evening arts performances were separated with the Kohler Women's Club continuing the lecture series and the Kohler Foundation continuing the arts programs under the Distinguished Guest Series title.

The arts series has continued and as of the 2018–2019 season was in its 75th year.

List of notable guests
This is a selected list of guests who have appeared in the series.  The selection criteria are based on documented appearances and the existence of Wikipedia articles.  Announced schedules are not considered authoritative due to some speakers and events being rescheduled or cancelled.

1940s

1950s

1960s

1970s

1980s

1990s

2000s

2010s

Notes

References

External links 

 

1944 establishments in Wisconsin
Annual events in Wisconsin
Kohler Company
Lecture series
Performing arts in Wisconsin
Sheboygan County, Wisconsin
Wisconsin culture